Cathedral of the Incarnation and Incarnation Cathedral are names of several churches:

Spain
Granada Cathedral
Málaga Cathedral

United States
Cathedral of the Incarnation (Baltimore, Maryland) (Episcopal)
Cathedral of the Incarnation (Garden City, New York) (Episcopal)
Cathedral of the Incarnation, Nashville, Tennessee (Roman Catholic)